Baby Cele - Maloka (born 22 March 1972) is a South African actress born in Umlazi, KwaZulu-Natal.

Career 
Cele gained recognition for her role as Kaltego Rathebe, a character she portrayed for eight years on the now defunct e.tv youth television soap opera Backstage.
She went on to play the role of Portia in the SABC 1 sitcom My Perfect Family.

In 2011, she portrayed the role of Beauty in the mini-series Shreds & Dreams, based on the 2004 play by Clare Stopford.

From 2012 to 2013, she portrayed the character of Slindile Dludlu in the Mzansi Magic telenovela Inkaba. Cele also starred as Gasta Cele in the soap opera Zabalaza.
In 2016, she portrayed the character of Sibongile Nene on Isidingo.

She was also a cast member of the stage musical Sarafina!. Cele also performed in the stage play Cards.

In 2018, she joined the cast of the telenovela Uzalo, where she portrays the character of Gabisile Mdletshe.

Personal life 
Cele is married to businessman Thabo Maloka. She is a mother of two children.

Awards and nominations

References 

1972 births
Living people
Actors from Durban
People from KwaZulu-Natal
Zulu people
South African actresses